Eugene Gilbride (1 October 1892 – 11 March 1972) was an Irish Fianna Fáil politician and farmer. He was elected to Dáil Éireann as a Fianna Fáil Teachta Dála (TD) for the Sligo–Leitrim constituency at the 1948 general election. He was re-elected at every subsequent general election until he retired from politics at the 1969 general election. He was a member of Sligo County Council from 1925 until his death in 1972.

References

1892 births
1972 deaths
Fianna Fáil TDs
Members of the 13th Dáil
Members of the 14th Dáil
Members of the 15th Dáil
Members of the 16th Dáil
Members of the 17th Dáil
Members of the 18th Dáil
Local councillors in County Sligo
Irish farmers